The Mercedes-Benz F700 is a concept car produced by Mercedes-Benz in 2007. It was first revealed to the public at the 2007 Frankfurt Motor Show.

It was given as a gift to UAE President Khalifa bin Zayed Al Nahyan.

DiesOtto engine

The F700 is powered by Mercedes' DiesOtto engine, so called because it combines elements of diesel and petrol (Otto cycle). As a result, the F700 has performance equivalent to the Mercedes-Benz S350, with a fuel consumption rating of 53 US MPG or 4.43L/100 km.

PRE-SCAN suspension

PRE-SCAN suspension was an upgrade of Active Body Control. Using PRE-SCAN suspension, the car not only reacts highly sensitively to uneven patches of road surface, but also acts in an anticipatory manner. PRE-SCAN uses two laser sensors in the headlamps as “eyes” that produce a precise picture of the road's condition. From this data, the control unit computes the´parameters for the active suspension settings in order to provide the highest level of comfort.
 
PRE-SCAN was an early prototype of Magic Body Control (with Road Surface Scan), that was introduced in 2013 on the Mercedes-Benz S-Class (W222). The series version uses visual light twin optical stereo cameras instead of laser.

References

External links 

F700
Articles containing video clips
Cars introduced in 2007
Rear-wheel-drive vehicles
Compact executive cars
Sedans